The Van Veghten House is a historic building in the Finderne section of Bridgewater Township, New Jersey, United States. The house was built  and served as the headquarters of Quartermaster General Nathanael Greene during the second Middlebrook encampment (1778–79) in the American Revolutionary War. The Somerset County Historical Society owns the house and uses it as its headquarters, including a museum and library. The early-18th-century Old York Road, connecting Philadelphia to New York City, passed by here. The house was added to the National Register of Historic Places on October 10, 1979, and noted as representing "one of the few remaining Raritan River mansions".

History
In 1697, Michael Van Veghten (also spelled Van Vechten, 1663–1737) purchased 834 acres along the Raritan River near Finderne. After his first wife died, he then married Jannetje Dumont on April 2, 1691. Their son Derrick (also spelled Dirck, 1699–1781) inherited the property when Michael died in 1737.

During the second Middlebrook encampment, Derrick Van Veghten, a patriot of the American Revolution, gave Quartermaster General Nathanael Greene and his wife, Catharine Littlefield Greene, the use of the house for his headquarters and the farm for an encampment of his troops, without asking for any compensation.

On March 19, 1779, General Greene described an event attended by General George Washington that was held at the Van Veghten House in a letter to Colonel Jeremiah Wadsworth: 

On August 30, 1781, the First Brigade of the French Army, the Expédition Particulière, under command of the French general Comte de Rochambeau, marched past this house, along the route to Yorktown, Virginia. The Second Brigade followed on August 31. The American Continental Army marched nearby along different roads as part of this joint effort.

After Derrick died in 1781, the estate passed to his son Michael Van Veghten (1764–1831).

Description
The house is two and a half stories plus a cellar. Brownstone is used for the foundation, and the first story features Flemish bond brickwork on the south and west walls; otherwise common bond brickwork is used. Iron beam anchors, which are both functional and decorative, are visible on the south wall by the arches of brick voussoirs above the window heads. The house was renovated  in the style of Greek Revival and features four mantelpieces of that style.

Gallery

See also
 Van Veghten's Bridge
Other houses used as headquarters during the second Middlebrook encampment (1778–79):
 Wallace House – General George Washington
 Van Horne House – General William Alexander, Lord Stirling
 Staats House – General Friedrich Wilhelm von Steuben
 Jacobus Vanderveer House – General Henry Knox

References

External links
 
  Van Veghten House
 
 
 
 

National Register of Historic Places in Somerset County, New Jersey
Houses on the National Register of Historic Places in New Jersey
New Jersey Register of Historic Places
Historic house museums in New Jersey
Greek Revival houses in New Jersey
1725 establishments in the Thirteen Colonies
Houses completed in 1725
Bridgewater Township, New Jersey
American Revolutionary War museums in New Jersey
Historic places on the Washington–Rochambeau Revolutionary Route
Brick buildings and structures
Historic American Buildings Survey in New Jersey
American Revolution on the National Register of Historic Places
New Jersey in the American Revolution